The following is a table of United States presidential elections in Nevada, ordered by year. Since its admission to statehood in 1864, Nevada has participated in every U.S. presidential election. Since New Mexico's statehood in 1912, Nevada has voted for the same candidate as New Mexico in all presidential elections except for 2000.

Winners of the state are in bold, and shaded in the party of the state winner.

See also

 Elections in Nevada

Notes

References